Dankowice may refer to:

Dankowice, Głogów County in Lower Silesian Voivodeship (south-west Poland)
Dankowice, Strzelin County in Lower Silesian Voivodeship (south-west Poland)
Dankowice, Wrocław County in Lower Silesian Voivodeship (south-west Poland)
Dankowice, Silesian Voivodeship (south Poland)